Lamannshaugen  is a hill in the municipality of Jevnaker in Viken county, Norway.

Mountains of Viken